The Kerry Tramway was a  narrow gauge railway built in 1887 to serve the timber workings and slab quarry to the south of the village of Kerry, near Newtown in mid Wales.

Route
The railway ran from the Cambrian Railways Kerry railway station at Glanmule to the Brynllywarch estate owned by Christopher Naylor. The line served the timber forests on the estate, as well as a slab quarry and general estate traffic. It was worked by the Bagnall locomotive Excelsior.

Closure
In 1895 Naylor inherited Haggerston Castle and left Brynllywarch; the rolling stock of the railway was sold and the track was lifted.

Reopening
During the First World War there was a great demand for timber. In 1917 the government Timber Supply Department (which later became the Forestry Commission) relaid much of the tramway to serve the sawmill on the estate. The railway and timber felling operations were mainly manned by German prisoners of war under military control. During the war, the line was worked by the Kerr Stuart locomotive Diana. After hostilities ceased the tramway continued to operate. In early 1919 a petrol locomotive arrived from Baguely and in 1922 a third locomotive, the Haig class Kashmir arrived.

Final closure
The line closed again in 1922 and all the tracks lifted except the Lower Rhos to Pentre section. This last remaining section was worked using an unknown 0-4-0 side tank locomotive for several more years.

Locomotives

References

 
 
 

2 ft gauge railways in Wales
Industrial railways in Wales
Forest railways
Railway lines opened in 1887